Hannah Gablać (born 25 February 1995) is a German field hockey player.

Career

National teams 
Gablać debuted for the German national team in 2013, and played in 2013 EuroHockey Championships where the team won gold.

She was part of the Germany women's junior national team at the 2016 Hockey Junior World Cup in Chile. In 2018 she participated in the Hockey World Cup where the German team came fifth.

Club hockey 
Gablać currently plays for Der Club an der Alster in the German Bundesliga. Previously she represented KTHC Rot-Weiß.

References

1995 births
Living people
German female field hockey players
Female field hockey forwards
Der Club an der Alster players
Feldhockey Bundesliga (Women's field hockey) players
21st-century German women